The 1997 CONCACAF Cup Winners' Cup was the sixth edition of this defunct tournament contended between 1991 and 1998.

Qualifying rounds

Northern Zone
Dallas Burn (USA) bye to final round.
Cruz Azul (Mexico) bye to final round.
Necaxa (Mexico) bye to final round.

Central Zone

First round
Plaza Amador qualified for second round as well, opposition unknown.  Olimpia and Municipal, who had reached the Cuadrangular Final of the abandoned 1996 edition, got byes into the second round.

Second round
Jong Colombia replaced Amatitlán.

Caribbean Zone

Won by Jong Colombia; instead of qualifying for the final round as originally
planned, they were added to the second round of the central zone.

Final round
Originally scheduled for March 1998 in Dallas with as quarterfinals Necaxa vs. Olimpia and Platense vs. Municipal; winners of the first were to play Cruz Azul in the semifinal; winners of the second were to play Dallas Burn in the second semifinal.  Format was changed for "scheduling and technical reasons".

The Dallas Burn hosted the 1998 CONCACAF Cup Winners' Cup tournament at the Cotton Bowl in Dallas on March 4, 6 and 8. The six-team tournament, was going to consist of three doubleheaders. It was going to feature  Burn, defending champion  Necaxa, 1997 Mexican Cup champion  Cruz Azul, and  Olimpia who had defeated  Belen.

The two remaining spots were going to be filled by the winner of the  Municipal vs.  Plaza Amador and the winner of the  Platense vs.  Jong Colombia. "This is a tremendous honor to host this tournament and an extremely high level of competition", said Burn GM Billy Hicks. "Necaxa, Cruz Azul and Olimpia are some of the best, most decorated champions on this half of the planet."

Group North

Group South

Final

References

2
CONCACAF Cup Winners Cup